Dinosaur from the Deep  is a 1993 French horror science-fiction B movie by filmmaker Norbert Moutier and starring Jean Rollin, Tina Aumont and Sylvaine Charlet.

Plot
After the death penalty has been abolished in 2004, and not knowing how to deal with an abominable criminal recidivist, the FBI's experts and lawyers decide to send the condemned on a journey through time to a time when the sentence still applied. For financial reasons, this expedition is coupled with a scientific mission charged with tracing the first dinosaurs. They find they did exist, and the crew is in pursuit of the prisoner now at large.

Production
The film was produced to capitalize on the success of Steven Spielberg's Jurassic Park. It was filmed with a low budget and the dinosaurs were made of clay and papier-mâché, and in some scenes moved in stop-motion, with a toy being used at some shots.

Cast
 Jean Rollin as Professeur Nolan
 Tina Aumont as Nora
 Sylvaine Charlet as Mme Nolan
 Guy Godefroy as Murder
 N.G. Mount as Kruger (as Bert Goldman)
 Quelou Parente as Cave Girl
 Christophe Bier as Lawyer
 Cécile Letargat as Nurse
 Gérard Stum as Avocado Man 
 Christian Letargat as Photographer

Release
The film was not released theatrically in France, but only in VHS in 1994.

Reception

References

External links 
 Monster Bis• Official site
 Dinosaur From the Deep on IMDb

1993 films
1990s monster movies
Films about dinosaurs
French science fiction horror films
Films using stop-motion animation
1990s science fiction horror films
1990s French films
1990s French-language films